Zarośle may refer to the following places:
Zarośle, Gmina Bobrowo in Kuyavian-Pomeranian Voivodeship (north-central Poland)
Zarośle, Gmina Zbiczno in Kuyavian-Pomeranian Voivodeship (north-central Poland)
Zarośle, Grudziądz County in Kuyavian-Pomeranian Voivodeship (north-central Poland)
Zarośle, Pomeranian Voivodeship (north Poland)